Yisrael Aharoni (born July 3, 1950) is an Israeli celebrity chef.

Biography 
Aharoni was born in Haifa, Israel, to Bukharan Jewish parents. Aharoni was enlisted to the Israel Defense Forces and served as a combat soldier in the Golani Brigade. He saw action in the War of Attrition. Following his discharge, he moved to the Netherlands to study art in Amsterdam, where he discovered Chinese cuisine. Upon his return to Israel, he lived in kibbutz Hulata and worked as a counselor for at-risk youth for two and a half years. He then left Israel to study cooking abroad, where he studied Chinese cuisine in Taiwan before apprenticing at upscale restaurants in France.

Culinary and media career 
In 1981, after he returned to Israel, Aharoni opened his first restaurant, "Yin-Yang," a Chinese restaurant on Rothschild Boulevard, and it became a success. Later, he opened another restaurant in Tel Aviv, "Tai-Chi" in Gan HaIr. In the late 1990s, he opened "Tapuach Hazahav" (The Golden Apple), a French gourmet restaurant which closed after several years. He owned the "Pat-Qua" Chinese-Thai restaurant in Herzliya. He has participated in the preparation of gala meals with leading international chefs.

He has hosted a number of television shows in Israel. He developed and hosted a 32-episode series on the foods of Israel's different ethnic groups. The show was purchased by the Italian Television Authority. A sequel series on different national cuisines was filmed abroad. He also hosted three seasons of a cooking show called "Private Lesson" and currently hosts "Aharoni Cooks for Friends".

Aharoni writes a culinary column for "Seven Days," the weekend magazine of the newspaper Yedioth Ahronoth, which has the largest Friday weekend circulation in Israel. He has traveled extensively throughout the world covering different cuisines and food trends. As of May 2013 the Union List of Israel lists 32 Hebrew cookbooks which Aharoni has authored or coauthored, including several in separate kosher and non-kosher editions. This includes 19 cookbooks he authored on his own, all of them bestsellers in Israel. With Nelli Sheffer he coauthored "Eating Alfresco: The Best Street Food in the World", published by Abraham's in the United States in 1999. In 2012 Aharoni was working on the Foods of the Silk Road and trying to enter American television.

He is a judge on MasterChef Israel.

Aharoni is also a guest disc jockey at Tel Aviv nightclubs.

References

External links 

 Website of Aharoni's cooking show 
 Website of the restaurant "Yin-Yang" on the Restaurant Portal of ROL.co.il
 Article about Aharoni in Yedioth Ahronoth

1950 births
Living people
Israeli television chefs
Israeli expatriates in the Netherlands
20th-century Israeli Jews
21st-century Israeli Jews
Bukharan Jews
People from Haifa